The 1977 World 600, the 18th running of the event, was a NASCAR Winston Cup Series racing event that took place on May 29, 1977, at Charlotte Motor Speedway in Concord, North Carolina.

Jim Stacy would become the owner of Krauskopf's NASCAR team after this event; with the famed red #71 Dodge getting repainted into the white #5. Neil Bonnett  would stay on the team as driver.

The mega-hit movie Star Wars was released four days before this race.

Qualifying

Summary
Forty drivers competed including Benny Parsons, Lennie Pond, Buddy Baker, Darrell Waltrip, and Neil Bonnett. After four hours and twenty-one minutes of racing, Richard Petty defeated polesitter David Pearson by 30.8 seconds in front of 115,000 people. There were 25 lead changes  in this race and six cautions for 31 laps. Last-place finisher Ramo Stott had engine trouble on lap 3 of the 400-lap race.

Drivers who failed to qualify for this race were Rick Newsom and Bruce Jacobi.

Dean Dalton was driving Henley Gray's car when it crashed on lap 64. It looked a lot like Dean Dalton's car with a #19 painted on.

Bobby Allison relieved Benny Parsons for the latter part of the race. 

Ricky Rudd would lead the first laps of his NASCAR Cup Series career during this race. Nord Krauskopf would retire as a NASCAR owner after this race; he would sell his team to Jim Stacy and focus running on his insurance business (K&K Insurance) with his wife Theodora.

Pearson's next pole position start would be at the 1977 running of the National 500 (now Bank of America 500); which took place that October.

Notable crew chiefs in the race were Tex Powell, Buddy Parrott, Jake Elder, Harry Hyde, Joey Arrington, Kirk Shelmerdine, Dale Inman, Tim Brewer, and Travis Carter.

Timeline
Section reference: 
 Start of race: David Pearson had an advantage over the rest of the starting grid as the green flag was waved.
 Lap 3: Oil pressure issues forced Ramo Stott to become the last-place finisher.
 Lap 63: Bobby Allison had to leave the race due to engine problems.
 Lap 64: Henley Grey had a terminal crash.
 Lap 87: Engine troubles eliminated Bobby Gale from the event.
 Lap 168: Dave Marcis would be sidelined due to a faulty engine.
 Lap 185: Ed Negre's vehicle developed engine problems.
 Lap 186: A faulty oil pump eliminated D.K. Ulrich from the race.
 Lap 219: Engine problems managed to knock Donnie Allison out of contention.
 Lap 240: David Sisco would see his race day end prematurely due to engine failure.
 Lap 266: Harry Gant's engine failed on this lap.
 Lap 271: The axle on Terry Ryan's vehicle became unsafe, causing him to DNF with a 29th-place finish.
 Lap 300: James Hylton's engine failed, causing him not to finish in the top-10.
 Lap 333: Harold Miller's vehicle developed clutch issues, making him the final DNF of the event.
 Finish: Richard Petty was officially declared the winner of the event.

Standings after the race

References

World 600
World 600
NASCAR races at Charlotte Motor Speedway